PK-19 Bajaur-II is a constituency for the Khyber Pakhtunkhwa Assembly of the Khyber Pakhtunkhwa province of Pakistan.It was created in 2018 after merger of FATA with Khyber Pakhtunkhwa before 2019 elections.

Members of Assembly

2019-2023: PK-101 Bajaur-II

Election 2019 
After merger of FATA with Khyber Pakhtunkhwa provincial elections were held for the very first time. Pakistan Tehreek-e-Insaf candidate Ajmal Khan Wazir won the seat by getting 12,204 votes.

Election 2023

See also 

 PK-18 Bajaur-I
 PK-20 Bajaur-III

References

External links 

 Khyber Pakhtunkhwa Assembly's official website
 Election Commission of Pakistan's official website
 Awaztoday.com Search Result
 Election Commission Pakistan Search Result

Khyber Pakhtunkhwa Assembly constituencies